Ruth Weiss (born 26 July 1924) is a writer who focuses on anti-racism in all its forms. She is a well-known anti-apartheid journalist and activist, exiled by South Africa and Rhodesia for her writings. She is based in the United Kingdom and Germany and writes in both English and German. Her young adult, historical fiction reflects her battles against racism in Germany and Africa.

Biography

Born Ruth Löwenthal in Fürth (near Nuremberg) in 1924, Ruth Weiss emigrated with her parents and sister to South Africa in 1936 to escape rising German persecution. Too poor to study at a university, she became a self-taught expert on African economics by working her way up to company secretary at South Africa Mining and General Assurance Company, one of the few females in the upper reaches of the then-male dominated insurance industry. She taught herself journalism by assisting her husband Hans Leopold Weiss, an African correspondent in the 1950s for several German papers. She was Business Editor of Newscheck, before joining the Financial Mail (FM). In 1966 she became FM's Bureau Chief in Salisbury (Harare), Southern Rhodesia (Zimbabwe), but was declared persona non grata by the white regime because of her critical reporting and "sanction busting" stories. She moved to The Guardian in London, returning in the 1970s to Africa as Business Editor of the Times of Zambia and Zambian Financial Times correspondent. From Lusaka she moved to Cologne, Germany, as an editor in the Voice of Germany's Africa-English department, before turning freelance in London in 1978. After covering the 1979 Lancaster House talks on Zimbabwe, she was invited to Zimbabwe to train economic journalists and was co-founder of the Southern African Economist. From 1987 to 1991 she worked on the staff of the Zimbabwe Institute of Southern Africa (ZISA), which facilitated secret meetings of white and black South Africans, ahead of official talks, which began in 1990 and led to the dismantling of apartheid. Starting in 1992 she wrote on the Isle of Wight for a decade. She moved to Germany in 2002 where she continues her research and writing of historical novels on anti-racism themes.

Awards

In 2005, Weiss was one of 1,000 women nominated for the Nobel Peace Prize by the group "Swiss Peace Women", based on her long history of opposition to apartheid resulting in her exile, for her lifelong work with German and Swiss anti-apartheid groups, her work in German schools on reconciliation between herself as a Jew forced to flee Germany and the post-Nazi German generations, and finally for her work with ZISA, which helped to bring white and black South Africans together prior to the dismantling of apartheid.

In 2010 a girls' high school in Aschaffenburg, Bavaria, was named the Ruth Weiss School, and a library containing her works was established. Nadine Gordimer wrote a letter that was read during the ceremony, and the Laudatio was given by Denis Goldberg, the only white on the trial with Nelson Mandela who, like the others, was sentenced to life imprisonment.

"Feresia" (a day in the life of a child in Zimbabwe) was listed as one of the best 20 German children's books of 1988.

"Sascha und die 9 alten Männer" was listed by the Catholic Best Children Books 1997 in Germany.

Selected works
"My Sister Sara" tells of a four-year-old, blonde German war orphan patriotically adopted in 1948 by an Afrikaner parliamentarian who sympathises with the Nazis. The family, a good family, falls in love with the child. When her papers arrive from the orphanage six months later, Pa discovers that Sara's roots are tainted; hate rips through the family. The rejected child only has two options: depression or rebellion. The story was selected as compulsory matriculation reading in the German state of Baden-Württemberg in 2007.

In "Mitzi's Wedding", a young German aristocrat defies convention to become a musician in the heady days of Berlin in the 1920s and '30s. Charming and exuberant, she braves the mesmerising ascent of Nazi Germany to marry one of the three men who love her. She is betrayed by the second who cowers before the voice of popular racism and, finally, continents away, is revenged by the third. This novel considers how racism impacts the intertwined, families of victims and oppressors and the everyday voices of silence and dissent.

"Judenweg" is the fictional account of a young Jew turned robber out of anger and defiance against 17th century anti-Jewish laws which forced thousands into homelessness, wandering along unmarked paths, unable to remain anywhere for longer than two days. The aimless walk from Fürth to Frankfurt took two weeks.

"Blutsteine" (Bloodstones) is a thriller set in Africa in the 90s, when diamonds were used in three-corner barter deals for weapons and drugs.

"Sascha und die neun alten Männer", a children's book, tells the adventure of a little Russian boy, who stumbles into a small house next to an old synagogue. Here he meets nine old men who have moved together in the hope that one day a Jew will visit the deserted quarter, so that they are "Minjan" – a congregation of ten Jews  – to enable them to hold a synagogue service. Sascha finds the tenth man.

One of her non-fiction works is a biography of Sir Garfield Todd, the unlikely New Zealand missionary who became the Prime Minister of Rhodesia but was sidelined because of his liberal policies of racial equality.
 
Another compares the Irish and African freedom movements.

The role of women in revolution is reflected, courageously and brutally, in The Women of Zimbabwe, where Weiss often cites the women's narratives directly. One woman's description of avoiding a massacre by hiding in a pit latrine for four days is particularly heart wrenching.

"Zimbabwe and the New Elite" examines the dashed hopes of Robert Mugabe's first independence decade where power was transferred from whites to a new black elite who all too readily abandoned the foundations of their revolution.

Her autobiography Wege im harten Gras (Paths Through Tough Grass) documents her life till the late 1980s and has an epilogue written by her friend, the Nobel Prize winner Nadine Gordimer.

Friends, a later autobiography, describes her life through a journalist's prism as it intersected with history: Nelson Mandela (South Africa), Thabo Mbeki (South Africa), Kenneth Kaunda (Zambia), Robert Mugabe (Zimbabwe), Premier Zhou Enlai (China), Barack Obama, Sr. (Kenya), Fidel Castro (Cuba), Tiny Roland (Lonrho Plc) and other manipulators of African mineral wealth, brushes with the South African secret police, and even meetings on the Royal Yacht Britannia (unpublished 2011).

Archive
Throughout her career, Ruth Weiss built up a collection of articles, manuscripts, biographical documents, professional correspondence, research material, photographs and audio recordings that she eventually entrusted to the archive of the 'Basler Afrika Bibliographien (Basel Africa Bibliographic library) in Basel. The collection consists of approximately eight meters of documents, 300 photographs and 180 audio tapes and cassettes. The parts of the collection received by BAB before November 2011 are catalogued and can be accessed through a finding aid. The photographs can be accessed via the BAB archive catalogue. The Ruth Weiss sound archive contains recordings of interviews made by Ruth Weiss, mostly in the 1970s and 1980s, with prominent actors from politics and economics but also ordinary people. The collection further contains recordings of press conferences, political events, independence celebrations, live music and readings. With support of Memoriav, the Swiss National Sound Archives digitalised the recordings which are now preserved as WAV and MP3 files. BAB published a finding aid for the Ruth Weiss sound archive that can be accessed online and in print.

English language books
Strategic Highways of Africa (1978)
Women of Zimbabwe (1986)
Zimbabwe and the New Elite (1994)
Sir Garfield Todd and the Making of Zimbabwe with Jane Papart (1998)
Peace in their Time; the peace process in Northern Ireland and southern Africa (London, 2000)

German language books
Lied ohne Musik (Autobiography. Laetare Verlag 1980)
Frauen Gegen Apartheid ed. (Women against Apartheid, Rowohlt 1980)
Die Frauen von Zimbabwe (Women of Zimbabwe, Frauenbuchverlag 1983)
Afrika den Europäern (with H. Meyer – 1884 Berlin Conference – Peter Hammer Verlag 1984)
Wir sind alle Südafrikaner (Brief History of South Africa – EB Verlag 1986)
Mandelas Zornige Erben (with Hannelore Oesterle – Revolt of the Township Youth – Peter Hammer 1986)
Die Saat Geht Auf (Zimbabwe's Agriculture – Peter Hammer 1987)
Feresia – (Peter Hammer 1988 – Children's book with photos by Graeme Desmidt – a day in the life of a child in Zimbabwe)
Menschen Werfen Schatten (Peter Hammer 1989 Profile of a rural project)
Wege Im Harten Gras (Autobiography, postscript by Nadine Gordimer – Peter Hammer 1994)
Sascha und die neun alten Männer (Children's book, Peter Hammer 1997)
Geteiltes Land (Profile of southern Africa – EB Verlag, 1997)
Reise nach Gaborone (short stories – Komzi Verlag 1997)
Nacht des Verrats (Thriller – Horlemann Verlag, 2000)
Meine Schwester Sara (Novel aset in the early Apartheid years – Maro Verlag 2002, dtv 2004)
Blutsteine (Novel set in diamond industry – Maro Verlag 2003)
Der Judenweg (Historical novel set in 17th century -Mosse Verlag 2004)
Die Nottaufe (Historical novel, sequel to Judenweg – Mosse Verlag 2006)
Mitzis Hochzeit (Novel – set in 20s and 30s of turbulent Berlin. Maro Verlag 2007)
Miss Moores Geburtstag (Crime, Trafo 2008)
Eingeladen War Ich Nicht (Autobiographical tales, Trafo 2008)
Memorys Tagebuch (Novel set in Mugabe's Zimbabwe, Trafo 2009)
Deborahs Lied (Historical novel set in 13th century England – Trafo 2010)
Miss Moore's Hausparty (Crime, Trafo 2010)

German television
"South Africa Belongs To Us," German TV, 1979, on South African women in which Winnie Mandela gave her first TV interview.
"ZDF Zeitzeugen" series (two one-hour features) 1995

German radio
"Europas blasses Judenkind," March 2011, Deutschlandfunk (repeated on WDR)

References 

1924 births

English writers
Living people
German women writers
English women writers
German emigrants to South Africa
South African expatriates in Southern Rhodesia
South African emigrants to the United Kingdom
British expatriates in Zambia